Kabrik (also Romanized as Kabrīk; also known as Kaberak, Kavarik, and Kyavaryk) is a village in Qareh Poshtelu-e Pain Rural District, Qareh Poshtelu District, Zanjan County, Zanjan Province, Iran. At the 2006 census, its population was 16, in 4 families.

References 

Populated places in Zanjan County